William Hughes (April 3, 1872January 30, 1918) was an American politician of Irish origin. A member of the Democratic Party, he served in both houses of the United States Congress as the U.S. representative for New Jersey's 6th congressional district from 1903 to 1905 and again from 1907 to 1912 and a United States senator from New Jersey from 1913 to 1918.

Biography
Hughes was born in Drogheda, Ireland and immigrated to the United States with his parents in 1880. They settled in Paterson, New Jersey. His first jobs were as a stenographer in New York City and a court reporter in Paterson. He served in the United States Army throughout the Spanish–American War after which he became a lawyer and practiced in Paterson.

In 1902, Hughes successfully ran for his first political office as a Democrat and represented New Jersey in the U.S. House of Representatives. He served a single term before falling to Henry C. Allen in his bid for re-election. In 1906, he ran again for the same seat and served three more terms in the House before resigning on September 12, 1912 to accept an appointment to be judge on the court of common pleas of Passaic County.

Months later, Hughes was elected to the United States Senate from New Jersey but served less than five years before dying in office at age 45.

Hughes is buried at Cedar Lawn Cemetery in Paterson, New Jersey.

See also
List of United States senators born outside the United States
List of United States Congress members who died in office (1900–49)

References

 William Hughes, late a senator from New Jersey, Memorial addresses delivered in the House of Representatives and Senate frontispiece 1919

 

1872 births
Irish emigrants to the United States (before 1923)
People from Drogheda
Politicians from County Louth
Democratic Party United States senators from New Jersey
Democratic Party members of the United States House of Representatives from New Jersey
1918 deaths
19th-century Irish people
Burials at Cedar Lawn Cemetery
19th-century American politicians